R. Rani is an Indian politician and incumbent Member of the Legislative Assembly of Tamil Nadu. She was elected to the Tamil Nadu legislative assembly as a Dravida Munnetra Kazhagam candidate from Uppiliyapuram constituency in 2006 elections.

References 

Dravida Munnetra Kazhagam politicians
Living people
Women in Tamil Nadu politics
21st-century Indian women politicians
21st-century Indian politicians
Year of birth missing (living people)
Tamil Nadu politicians